Actinobolin is a antibiotic with the molecular formula C13H20N2O6. Actinobolin is produced by the bacterium Streptomyces griseoviridus var atrofaciens.

References

Further reading 

 
 
 

Antibiotics
Lactones
Amides
Isochromenes